Karagay (Qarağay) is a rural locality (a village) in Ilkineyevsky Selsoviet, Kuyurgazinsky District, Bashkortostan, Russia. The population was 46 as of 2010. There are 2 streets.

Geography 
Karagay is located 20 km north of Yermolayevo (the district's administrative centre) by road. Karagayka is the nearest rural locality.

References 

Rural localities in Kuyurgazinsky District